Anarbaria is a census town in the Habra I CD block in the  Barasat Sadar subdivision of the North 24 Parganas district in the state of West Bengal, India.

Geography

Location

Area overview
The area covered in the map alongside is largely a part of the north Bidyadhari Plain. located in the lower Ganges Delta. The country is flat. It is a little raised above flood level and the highest ground borders the river channels.54.67% of the people of the densely populated area lives in the urban areas and 45.33% lives in the rural  areas.

Note: The map alongside presents some of the notable locations in the subdivision. All places marked in the map are linked in the larger full screen map.

Demographics
According to the 2011 Census of India, Anarbaria had a total population of 5,895, of which 2,973 (50%) were males and 2,922 (50%) were females. Population in the age range 0-6 years was 582. The total number of literate persons in  Anarbaria was 4,432 (83.42% of the population over 6 years).

As per the 2011 Census of India, Habra Urban Agglomeration had a total population of 304,584, of which 154,863 (51%) were males and 149,723 (49%) were females. Population below 6 years was 23,023. The total number of literates in Habra UA was 256,313 (91.03% of the population over 6 years). The constituents of Habra Urban Agglomeration were Habra (M), Ashoknagar Kalyangarh (M), Bara Bamonia (CT), Guma (CT), Anarbaria (CT) and Khorddabamonia (CT).

Infrastructure
According to the District Census Handbook, North Twenty Four Parganas,  2011, Anarberia covered an area of 1.574 km2. The protected water-supply involved hand pump, tank, pond, lake. It had 545 domestic electric connections. Among the medical facilities it had 1 medicine shop. Among the educational facilities, it had 2 primary schools, other schools at Prithiba 4  km away. The nearest college was 5 km away at Habra. It specialises in tailoring and pottery. It has the branch office of 1 nationalised bank.

References

Cities and towns in North 24 Parganas district